Matthew England is a physical oceanographer and climate scientist.  He is currently Scientia Professor of Ocean & Climate Dynamics at the University of New South Wales, Sydney, Australia.

Education 
In 1987 England completed a B.Sc. (Honours Class I and University Medal) at the University of Sydney, Australia, followed by a Doctor of Philosophy (PhD) in 1992, holding a Fulbright Scholarship at Princeton University in 1990.

Research and career 
After completing his PhD he took up a postdoctoral research fellowship at the Centre National de la Recherche Scientifique, in Toulouse, France, from 1992-1994. England then returned to Australia to take up a research scientist position at CSIRO Oceans and Atmosphere, before moving to the University of New South Wales. In 2005 he was awarded an Australian Research Council Federation Fellowship followed by an ARC Laureate Fellowship in 2010. England established the Climate Change Research Centre at the University of New South Wales with Professor Andrew Pitman in 2007.

England was an organizer and signatory of the 2007 Bali Declaration by Climate Scientists, and the convening lead author of the Copenhagen Diagnosis in 2009, chairing its release in Copenhagen at the UNFCCC COP15 meeting.

England's work relates to the global ocean circulation and its influence on the atmosphere, ice, and climate, with a particular focus on ocean-atmosphere processes in the tropics, the circulation in both the ocean and atmosphere in the Southern Hemisphere mid-latitudes, and coupled ocean-ice-atmosphere feed-backs around Antarctica.

Honors and awards
England was elected a Fellow of the Australian Academy of Science in 2014.   He is also a fellow of the Royal Society of New South Wales (2015), and a fellow of the American Geophysical Union (2016).    His other awards include:
Jaeger Medal (2023) awarded by the Australian Academy of Science
ISI Web of Science Highly Cited Researcher (2019, 2020, 2021, 2022)
James Cook Medal (2019) awarded by the Royal Society of New South Wales
Tinker-Muse Prize for Science and Policy in Antarctica (2017) awarded by the Tinker-Muse foundation
Sydney Institute of Marine Science Emerald Award (2017)
UK Diamond Jubilee Visiting Fellow (2016)
New South Wales Premier's Prize for Excellence in Mathematics, Earth Sciences, Chemistry and Physics, 2012
Australian Laureate Fellowship, 2010, awarded by the Australian Research Council 
Future Justice Prize (2010)
Australian Museum Eureka Prize for Water Research (2008)
Banksia Foundation Australian Environmental Researcher of the Year Award (2008) 
Royal Society of Victoria Research Medal (2007)
Australian Museum Eureka Prize for Environmental Research (2006)
Federation Fellowship (2005) awarded by the Australian Research Council (2005)
Priestley Medal (2005) awarded by the Australian Meteorological and Oceanographic Society
Flagship Fellow, 2005, awarded by CSIRO 
Frederick White Prize, 2004 awarded by the Australian Academy of Science
RH Clarke Lecture, 2004, awarded by the Australian Meteorological and Oceanographic Society
QEII Fellowship, 1998, awarded by the Australian Research Council 
Fulbright Scholarship (1990) Princeton University
University Medal, 1987, awarded by The University of Sydney

References

External links 
Climate Change Research Centre homepage
Google Scholar

1966 births
Living people
Australian climatologists
Australian oceanographers
Academic staff of the University of New South Wales
University of Sydney alumni
Fellows of the Australian Academy of Science